Jared Madere (born July 11, 1986, New York City) is an American contemporary artist and curator who lives and works in Berlin, Germany.

Early life

Madere was born in New York City, New York, in 1986. He attended the Norwich Free Academy in Norwich Connecticut. He studied Painting and Sound at the School of the Art Institute of Chicago and earned a BFA in 2009.

Career

Artistic practice

Madere began exhibiting his large scale installations internationally with the generational survey of monumental works DOOM: SURFACE Controle curated by Renaud Jerez at Le Magasin - Centre National d'Art Contemporain, Grenoble FR. Soon after this, Madere opened his North American solo debut at The Whitney Museum of American Art with an Untitled sculptural exhibition organized by curator Christopher Y. Lew.

Madere spent the first half of 2017 in Himachal Pradesh, India creating tapestries for the exhibition Anasthasia and Zoey staged in the hills below Gallu Devi. Later in the year, Madere was commissioned to create Unconditional Love, which would fill the atrium of the London department store Liberty for about 36 hours before it was removed due to graphic imagery of a newborn child dripping vernix caseosa.

In 2018, Madere began work on his first sculptural opera Oouolyamtelbellembem Magical Crisis In The Special V.I.P. Spot which debuted in Los Angeles in November 2018 beneath the outgoing flight path of LAX International Airport. The following year Madere expanded upon this string of Frozen Operas with Stepped Onto The Moving Stairs Before I Could Tie My Shoes in Berlin and En Route To Burn The Palace I Was Told So Much Of The Queen's Virtues That By The Time I Reached The Gate I Had Become A Guard within their installation Pavilion Du Voyageurs for Nicolas Bourriaud's 16th edition of the Istanbul Biennial, The Seventh Continent. In 2021, Madere staged their fourth Frozen Opera, The Unpopular Courage of Dutchess Orchid Drop on the artificial snowboarding slope of Copenhagen's trash burning power plant Copenhill.

Madere's work results from hyper-collaborative processes enacted during its creation involving craftsmen, technicians, tattoo artists, scientists, chefs, and children. In addition to living collaborators, Madere often works with various implementations of machine learning artificial intelligence-based processes to assist in the creation of both sound and image.

In addition to the diversity of collaborators, the physical makeup of Madere's output is equally varied, working with a wide range of materials including lipstick, raspberries, terrazzo, figure skating hairnets, flowers, scent diffusers, and vehicle wrap.

Madere continues to create and exhibit work across multiple media in the form of sculpture, image, installation, video, sound, live opera, music videos, and long-form documentation.

Madere's works have been exhibited internationally at various institutions and galleries, including the Whitney Museum of American Art, Le Magasin - Centre National d'ArtContemporain, La Panacée, Liberty (department store) London, The Istanbul Biennial, Armada Milano, David Lewis Gallery, Bortolami, and The Watermill Center.

Curatorial Practice

After moving to Brooklyn, New York, he opened the Bed-Stuy Love Affair gallery in 2013, where he exhibited the work of many of his contemporaries, including Bradley Kronz, Valerie Keane, Darja Bajagić, Rochelle Goldberg, Win McCarthy, Ben Schumacher, Sam Anderson, Veit Laurent Kurz, Joseph Geagan, Olga Balema, Jessi Reaves, and Jake Cruzen.

In 2014, the gallery became a mobile exhibition venue when it moved into a 30-foot truck complete with wrought iron gates armoring all of the vehicle windows, pink marble floors, and a flatscreen television with surround sound system, which played Tekken during exhibition openings.

In mid-2017, Madere opened the hybrid digital and traditional exhibition venue Mother Culture Los Angeles with artist Jake Cruzen and curator Milo Conroy.

Notable work

 The Unpopular Courage of Dutchess Orchid Drop, Cucina X Copenhill, Copenhagen, 2021
 En route to burn the palace, I was told so much of the queen's virtues that by the time I reached the gate, I had become a guard, IKSV Istanbul Biennial, 2019
 Stepped Onto the Moving Stairs Before I Could Tie My Shoes, Mother Culture Berlin, Berlin, 2019
 Oouolyamtelbellembem Magical Crisis In The Special V.I.P. Spot, A Frozen Opera (2018)
 All Human Resources Shared Equally Now, La Panacée, Montpellier, France, 2018
 Unconditional Love, Liberty, London, 2017
 Untitled, Whitney Museum of American Art, New York, NY, 2015
 Untitled, Armada, Milan, Italy, 2015
 Untitled, Le Magasin, Grenoble, France 2014

Reception

Noam Segal writes for the catalog of Nicolas Bourriaud's Crash Test, in both his artistic practice, Madere's works focus on "the annulment of any hierarchical order in the material and symbolic realm" and "the abolition of structures such as the superiority of discourse and western time perception."

Critic Clayton Press writes for Forbes, "it is difficult to capture the very real sense of ecstatic, if not romantic, intoxication that Madere conjures with his installations, environments, and visualizations."

Madere's work has been written about in international publications including Interview Magazine, ArtNews.com, Flash Art,  The Times, The New York Times, Forbes, Mousse, ArtReview, and Artforum.

Permanent Collection

 Whitney Museum of American Art, New York, NY
 The Watermill Center, Water Mill, NY
 Kaikai Kiki, Tokyo

Exhibitions

Selected solo and two person exhibitions

2015

 Jared Madere, Whitney Museum of American Art, New York, NY
 Jared Madere, Armada, Milan, Italy

2016

 Islands in the Stream, David Lewis, New York, NY
 Jake Cruzen & Jared Madere: Prince Cherrie, White Flag Projects, Saint Louis, MO

2017

 Unconditional Love, curated by Victor Benady, Liberty, London
 Anasthasia & Zoe, Kangra Valley, Himachal Pradesh India

2018

 OOUOLYAMTELBELLEMBEM MAGICAL CRISIS IN THE SPECIAL V.I.P. SPOT, Mother Culture Los Angeles, Los Angeles

2019

 En route to burn the palace I was told so much of the queen's virtues that by the time I reached the gate I had become a guard, Mother Culture Istanbul, Istanbul
 STEPPED ONTO THE MOVING STAIRS BEFORE I COULD TIE MY SHOES, Mother Culture Berlin, Berlin

2020

 In the back of the restaurant I made him kiss the ring | Haunted House in the Key of New Years, Galleria Federico Vavassori, Milan
 Paths to G-ddess~ Tiny Dick Timmy Ricochet~ Live from the Geomancer's Clit Ring, Galleria Federico Vavassori, Milan
 You say one thing n everyone acts like you don't mean the opposite of it at the same time too, Galleria Federico Vavassori, Milan

2021

 The Unpopular Courage of Dutchess Orchid Drop, Cucina X Copenhill, Copenhagen
 The Premonition of Dutchess Orchid Drop, Cucina, Copenhagen

Selected group exhibitions

2010

 179 Canal / Anyways, White Columns, New York, NY

2011

 I don't know if it makes any sense – I feel quite dizzy and a little drunk due to the blow. I will return with more info shortly…, Imo Projects, Copenhagen, Denmark
 Drawings, Drawings, Photographs, Rachel Uffner Gallery, New York, NY

2012

 Pinot Noir, Tomorrow Gallery, Toronto, Canada
 Memoirs of a Shy Pornographer, Oslo, Norway
 Ten Ten, Jason Alexander, New York, NY

2013

 Turnkey of Forever After, Bed-Stuy Love Affair, New York, NY
 Sallie Gardner, Michael Thibault Gallery, Los Angeles, CA
 Dare 2 Love Yourself:Momentum 7, Momentum kunstall, Moss, Norway

2014
 DOOM : SURFACE Contrôle, Le Magasin, Grenoble, France
 From whose ground heaven and hell compare, Croy Nielsen, Berlin, Germany
 BLOOMINGTON: MALL OF AMERICA, NORTH SIDE FOOD COURT, ACROSS FROM BURGER KING & THE BANK OF PAYPHONES THAT DON'T TAKE INCOMING CALLS, Bortolami, New York, NY
 Roseview, Young Art, Los Angeles, CA

2015

 The Story of O(OO), David Lewis, New York, NY
 Jared Madere presents Bed-Stuy Love Affair, Whitney Museum of American Art, New York, NY

2017

 Everything Is More Than One Thing Future Feel Good, Mother Culture Los Angeles, Los Angeles, CA
 From Counterculture to Cyberculture, curated by David Lewis, Altman Siegel, San Francisco, CA
 Fly Into The Sun, The Watermill Center, Southampton, NY

2018

 Crash Test, Curated by Nicolas Bourriaud, La Panacée, Montpellier, France
 LoopStar Future Feel Good, Mother Culture Los Angeles, Los Angeles, CA

2019

 The Seventh Continent, curated by Nicolas Bourriaud, Istanbul Biennial, Istanbul, Turkey

2020

 It could have been easy but it was still nice, Mother Culture Berlin, Berlin

Curatorial

 2008-2009: Curator/founder, New York City Gallery, Chicago
 2013–present: Curator/founder, Bed-Stuy Love Affair, New York
 2017–present: Curator/founder, Mother Culture, Los Angeles

Selected bibliography

2010

 Zak Kitnick, "not so autonomous maybe: 179 Canal at White Columns." IDIOM, November 10.

2014

 "NO ENTITY CAN EVER FULLY COMPREHEND ANOTHER ENTITY." Mousse Issue 43, April – May.

2015

 Andrew Russeth, "Because This Gallery Can Get Stuck in Traffic." New York Magazine, December 13.
 "Frank Stella, Rachael Rose and Jared Madere at Whitney Museum, New York." Mousse, December 11.
 Alexander Shulan, "Jared Madere." Kaleidoscope, October 30.
 Adam Lehrer, "Artist and Bed-Stuy Love Affair Founder Jared Madere Opens Whitney Museum Installation." Forbes, October 15.
 Tobi Haslett, "The Story of O(OO)"." Artforum, May 8.
 Ken Johnson, "Review: The Story of O(OO) at David Lewis Gallery." New York Times, May 7. "The Story of O(OO)." Art in America, April 28.

2016

 "Jake Cruzen & Jared Madere at White Flag Projects, St. Louis," ARTnews, June 30.
 Emily Stokes, "The Next Generation of Artists' Studios," T Magazine, April 12.

2017

 Gwen Allen, "From Counterculture to Cyberculture," Artforum, October.
 Alexander, Joe, "The Watermill Center: Flying Into The Sun." Social Life, August 18.
 Sanderson, David, "Artist baffled as Liberty ditches work," The Times London, July 14.
 "Liberty Department Store Pull Art Installations And Performances For Being Off-Brand," Artlyst, July 12.
 Greenberger, Alex, "London Department Store Removes Works by Jared Madere and Architecture Social Club, Citing 'Technical Issues'," ARTnews, July 11.

2018

 Patrick Steffen, "Jake Cruzen and Jared Madere / Mother Culture", Flash Art, January 17.
 Ezra Marcus, "Inside the Psychedelic Mind of Jared Madere", Interview, January 11.

2019

 Ross Simonini, "a bed of lettuce w edible flowers n butterscotch n blueberries drizzled on top dotted w chunks of habanero minced garlic and shredded ginger on an alabaster plate", Mousse.
 Clayton Press, "Oouolyamtelbellembem Magical Crisis In The Special V.I.P. Spot, A Frozen Opera By Jared Madere", Forbes.

2020

 Milo Conroy, "Jared Madere 'Paths to G-ddess~ Tiny Dick Timmy Ricochet~ Live from the Geomancer’s Clit Ring' Federico Vavassori / Milan”, Flash Art.

2021

 Jared Madere, "Kalpavriksha for Little Richard: Recent Developments in Artificial Intelligence as they Pertain to Social Imagination”, Flash Art.

References

Living people
1986 births
American contemporary artists
Artists from New York City